In the 2014–15 season, ES Sétif competed in the Ligue 1 for the 45th season, as well as the Algerian Cup.  It was their 17th consecutive season in the top flight of Algerian football. They also competed in the CAF Champions League, the Algerian Cup the CAF Super Cup and the FIFA Club World Cup.

Squad list
Players and squad numbers last updated on 16 August 2014.Note: Flags indicate national team as has been defined under FIFA eligibility rules. Players may hold more than one non-FIFA nationality.

Competitions

Overview

Ligue 1

League table

Results summary

Results by round

Matches

Algerian Cup

2014 Champions League

Group stage

Semi-finals

Final

2015 Champions League

First round

Second round

FIFA Club World Cup

CAF Super Cup

Squad information

Playing statistics

|-
! colspan=14 style=background:#dcdcdc; text-align:center| Goalkeepers

|-
! colspan=14 style=background:#dcdcdc; text-align:center| Defenders

|-
! colspan=14 style=background:#dcdcdc; text-align:center| Midfielders

|-
! colspan=14 style=background:#dcdcdc; text-align:center| Forwards

|-
! colspan=14 style=background:#dcdcdc; text-align:center| Players transferred out during the season

Goalscorers
Includes all competitive matches. The list is sorted alphabetically by surname when total goals are equal.

Transfers

In

Out

References

ES Sétif seasons
Algerian football clubs 2014–15 season